Andrea Vendrame (born 20 July 1994 in Conegliano) is an Italian cyclist, who currently rides for UCI WorldTeam . In May 2018, he was named in the startlist for the Giro d'Italia.

Major results

2014
 10th Gran Premio della Liberazione
 10th Trofeo Città di San Vendemiano
2015
 1st Giro del Belvedere
 5th Gran Premio della Liberazione
 5th Giro del Medio Brenta
 10th GP Capodarco
2016
 2nd Ruota d'Oro
 2nd Piccolo Giro di Lombardia
 3rd  Road race, UEC European Under-23 Road Championships
 4th Coppa Sabatini
 5th Giro del Belvedere
 8th Gran Premio di Poggiana
2017
 1st  Mountains classification Four Days of Dunkirk
 4th Overall Boucles de la Mayenne
 5th Gran Premio di Lugano
 6th Overall Tour de Bretagne
1st Stage 7
 7th Classic Loire-Atlantique
2018
 3rd Paris–Camembert
 4th La Roue Tourangelle
 6th Overall Circuit de la Sarthe
 9th Gran Premio di Lugano
2019
 1st Tro-Bro Léon
 2nd Tour du Finistère
 3rd GP Industria & Artigianato di Larciano
 4th Tre Valli Varesine
 5th Road race, National Road Championships
 5th Overall Tour of Slovenia
 5th Grand Prix of Aargau Canton
 7th Giro della Toscana
 8th Giro dell'Appennino
 9th Overall Circuit de la Sarthe
1st Stage 4
 9th Coppa Sabatini
 10th Paris–Camembert
2020
 4th Road race, National Road Championships
 4th Paris–Camembert
 4th Trofeo Laigueglia
 6th Overall Tour de Wallonie
 8th Race Torquay
2021
 1st Stage 12 Giro d'Italia
 Route d'Occitanie
1st  Points classification
1st Stage 1
 2nd Classic Grand Besançon Doubs
 8th Trofeo Laigueglia
 10th Tour du Jura
2022
 5th GP Industria & Artigianato
 5th GP Miguel Induráin
 6th Milano–Torino
 9th Coppa Bernocchi
2023
 2nd Trofeo Laigueglia
 3rd Muscat Classic
 5th Clàssica Comunitat Valenciana 1969
 8th Milano–Torino

Grand Tour general classification results timeline

References

External links

1994 births
Living people
Italian male cyclists
People from Conegliano
Italian Giro d'Italia stage winners
Cyclists from the Province of Treviso